Tewa is a Tanoan language spoken by some Pueblo people, mostly in the Rio Grande valley in New Mexico north of Santa Fe, and in Arizona. It is also known as Tano, or Tée-wah (archaic). There is some disagreement among the Tewa people about whether or not Tewa should have a written form, as some Pueblo elders believe that their language should be preserved by oral tradition alone. However, many Tewa speakers have decided that Tewa literacy is an important aspect in passing down the language and so orthographies have been created for this purpose.

The language has struggled to maintain a healthy speaker base; however, because of efforts to preserve the language starting in the 1980s—both by native speakers and linguists—this problem is not as dire as it for some other indigenous languages.

Tewa has a fairly large phoneme inventory with 45 distinct individual sounds. 12 of these are vowels, which can be either long or short. Tewa, like other Tanoan languages, also makes use of tones, of which it has 4.

Dialects and usage 
The 1980 census counted 1,298 speakers, almost all of whom are bilingual in English. Each pueblo or reservation where it is spoken has a dialect:

 Nambe Pueblo: 50 speakers (1980); 34 speakers (2004)
 Pojoaque Pueblo: 25 speakers (1980)
 San Ildefonso Pueblo (P'ohwhóge Owingeh): 349 speakers
 Ohkay Owingeh: 495 speakers (1980)
 Santa Clara Pueblo: 207 speakers (1980)
 Tesuque Pueblo: 172 speakers (1980)

As of 2012, Tewa is defined as "severely endangered" in New Mexico by UNESCO.

Tewa can be written with the Latin script; this is occasionally used for such purposes as signs (Be-pu-wa-ve, "Welcome", or sen-ge-de-ho, "Bye"). Because alphabet systems have been developed in the different pueblos, Tewa has a variety of orthographies rather than a single standardized alphabet. The written form of the language is not as ubiquitous as in languages such as Cherokee or Navajo, because some Tewa speakers feel that the language should be passed on through the oral tradition. The Tewa language was a spoken language through the 1960s; digital language documentation efforts were underway as of 1995.

One of the main dialectical delineations of the Santa Clara dialect is the use of /j/ in words where only /y/ is heard in other pueblos, although some Santa Clara speakers use /y/ and /j/ sporadically.

Another important dialectical difference aligns Santa Clara, Tesuque, and San Ildefonso Tewa against San Juan and Nambe Tewa. The former use /d/ in the same enviroments where the latter use a nasal plus /d/.

In two-syllable word bases, words that have a short /u/ in the initial syllable have a long /u/ in the Santa Clara dialect. In the Santa Clara dialect, where other pueblos have a high tone on this syllable, there will instead be a glide tone.

Phonology 

The phonemes of Rio Grande Tewa are as follows:

Consonants 

 The voiced postalveolar affricate  occurs in the Santa Clara dialect.
 All alveolars shown are apico-alveolar. 
  is apico-dental.
  is pronounced as  if proceeding velar or glottal consonants, or an external transition.

Vowels 

 Vowels have both length and nasal differentiation.
 In syllables closed by nasal consonants or in final weak stressed syllables,  occurs as [ɪˆ].
  is [e] when long, but is [eˇ] when short and [əˆ] when closed by a nasal consonant.
 , when following  is realized a bit raised, and when following  is realized as [əˆ].
  is realized as [ʊˆ] in syllables closed by a nasal vowel.

Syllable Structure 
There are 9 types of syllables in Tewa: CV, CV:, CVN, CVh, CVʔ, CV', CVʔN, V, and VN.

Tone 
Tewa has three tones, high, low, and glide. 

Within two-syllable words, the only combinations found are high-high, low-low, low-high, and high-low.

Stress 
The use of stress in Tewa is still relatively unknown.

In two-syllable nouns with the pattern CVCV and the tone pattern high-high or low-low, there is heavier stress placed on the first syllable. Roots also tend to show heavier stress than affixes if each is the same syllable and tone type. A stronger stress is associated with a higher tone and greater vowel length. However, because of the complex use of tone, syllable type, and contour segments more research does need to be done.

Morphology

Verbs 

Tewa has 15 types of verbs, and a few example verbs and their conjugations are shown below.

Verbs can be divided into two classes, S and A, standing for stative and active, based of the pronomial prefixes which they contain. In general, S verbs deal with identity, quality, feeling, condition, position, and motion. Class A verbs are, in general, transitive verbs.

Verb affixes 

All known verb affixes are included in the chart below

This affixes are used to delineate tense, subject, negation, and emphasis.

Nouns 

Nouns are divided into two classes: class N, which is affixed with set marker /-n/, and class non-N, which doesn't have this affix. 

Class non-N is the larger of the two, containing almost all nouns in Tewa, which are, for the most part, mono- or di-syllabic.

Class N nouns are comprised mostly of designations for age-sex differentiation, kinship terms, and forms which translate as pronouns.

Noun Affixes 
All known noun affixes are included in the chart below.

/-n2/ is different from /-n/ because of the occurrence of /-n2/ with singular, dual, and plural situations involving the same root, which is never the case for /-n/.

Class Z words 

Class Z words are neither particles, verbs, or nouns. They are affixable with suffixes like /-á/, /-ân/, /-bo/, and /-ho'/, /-reʔ/, /-an/, /-we/, and /-ge/, but unlike nouns and verbs they do not occur with the specific affixes which delineate those classes (/wé:-/ or /pi-/ and /-ví/ respectively).

These compromise words whose English equivalents involve time, location, manner, interrogation, etc.

Morphological Processes 

 Substitution: 
 /d/ becomes /r/, /d/ being the initial occurrence and following /n/.
 /b/ becomes /v/ in similar vowels to the /d/ ~ /r/ substitution. 
 /n/ becomes /m/, with the latter occurring before labials and the latter elsewhere. 
 Augmentation: Some suffixes occur with a longer form following /n/. 
 Contraction: Certain suffixes occur preceding /-á/ series marker, /-á/ emphasizer, /-ân/ emphasizer, and /-an/ question marker.

Syntax

Word Order 
Tewa is a subject-object-verb sentence, however there are simple sentences in Tewa such as "handiriho gi-c'u" (that's how we got in) that is simply a subject and a predicate.

Number 
Tewa, like other Tanoan languages, has a 3 number system and differentiates between singular, dual, and plural nouns. 

However, Tewa also appears to group its nouns into two categories: those of "sets" and "entities," with sets being marked by the affix /-n/ and entities the lack of said affix. Because of this, when creating plurality out of an entity, the affix /-n/ must be removed and the base root will be one not seen outside of plurality or duality.

Language revitalization 
Esther Martinez, who lived to be 94 years old, was nationally known for her commitment to preserving the Tewa language. Her San Juan Pueblo Tewa Dictionary was published in 1982. The Esther Martinez Native American Languages Preservation Act is named for her, and as of Sept. 15, 2012, members of the New Mexico congressional delegation have introduced legislation to extend the program for another five years.

Tewa language programs are available for children in most of the Tewa-speaking pueblos. The Santa Clara Pueblo Tewa Language Revitalization Program also sponsors cultural activities, such as visiting Crow Canyon.

Children's stories in Tewa have been digitized by the University of New Mexico, and are available online.

A 2012 documentary film, "The Young Ancestors", follows a group of teenagers from Santa Fe Preparatory School as they learn the Tewa language in a self-study program with the help of a mentor, seventh grade literature teacher Laura Kaye Jagles.

References 

 Harrington, John P. (1910). A brief description of the Tewa language. American Anthropologist, 12, 497-504.
 Speirs, Randall. (1966). Some aspects of the structure of Rio Grande Tewa. (Doctoral dissertation, SUNY Buffalo).
 Martinez, Esther. (1982). San Juan Pueblo Tewa Dictionary. San Juan Pueblo Bilingual Program, San Juan Pueblo, New Mexico.

Further reading

 Ortman, Scott G. (2012) Winds from the North: Tewa Origins and Historical Anthropology. .

External links
 Tano/Tewa Indian Language
 OLAC resources in and about the Tewa language
 Tewa Language-SantaFedia
 New Testament in Tewa
 Research paper on Tewa 

Tanoan languages
Indigenous languages of New Mexico
Indigenous languages of Arizona
Indigenous languages of the Southwestern United States
Indigenous languages of the North American Southwest
Tewa